This is a list of high schools in the state of Mississippi.

Adams County
Adams County Christian School, Natchez
Cathedral High School, Natchez
Natchez High School, Natchez 
Trinity Episcopal Day School, Natchez (Closed)

Alcorn County
Alcorn Central High School, Glen
Biggersville High School, Corinth
Corinth High School, Corinth
Kossuth High School, Kossuth

Amite County
Amite County High School, Liberty
Amite Vocational/Technical Complex, Liberty

Attala County
Ethel High School, Ethel
Kosciusko High School, Kosciusko
Old Dominion Christian School, Kosciusko

Benton County
Ashland Middle/High School, Ashland
Hickory Flat Attendance Center, Hickory Flat

Bolivar County
Bayou Academy, Cleveland
Northside High School (former Broad Street High School), Shelby
Cleveland Central High School (former Cleveland High School), Cleveland
McEvans Warriors K-12 School (former Shaw High School), Shaw
West Bolivar High School, Rosedale

Calhoun County
Bruce High School, Bruce
Calhoun Academy, Calhoun City
Calhoun City High School, Calhoun City
Vardaman High School, Vardaman

Carroll County
Carroll Academy, Carrollton
J. Z. George High School, North Carrollton

Chickasaw County
Houlka Attendance Center High School, Houlka
Houston High School, Houston
Houston Vocational/Technical Education Center
Okolona High School, Okolona

Choctaw County
Choctaw County High School, Ackerman (formerly Ackerman HS)
French Camp Academy, French Camp

Claiborne County
Port Gibson High School, Port Gibson

Clarke County
Enterprise High School, Enterprise
Quitman High School, Quitman

Clay County
Hebron Christian School, Pheba
Oak Hill Academy, West Point
West Point High School, West Point

Coahoma County
 Clarksdale High School, Clarksdale
Coahoma Agricultural High School, Clarksdale
Coahoma County High School, Clarksdale
Lee Academy, Clarksdale

Copiah County
Copiah Academy, Gallman
Crystal Springs High School, Crystal Springs
Hazlehurst High School, Hazlehurst
Wesson Attendance Center, Wesson

Covington County
Collins High School, Collins
Mount Olive High School, Mount Olive
Seminary High School, Seminary

DeSoto County
Center Hill High School, Olive Branch
DeSoto Central High School, Southaven
Hernando High School, Hernando
Horn Lake High School, Horn Lake
Lake Cormorant High School, Lake Cormorant
Lewisburg High School, Olive Branch 
Olive Branch High School, Olive Branch
Southaven High School, Southaven

Forrest County
Forrest County Agricultural High School, Brooklyn
North Forrest High School, Hattiesburg
Petal High School, Petal
Presbyterian Christian High School, Hattiesburg
Sacred Heart High School, Hattiesburg

Franklin County
Franklin County High School, Meadville

George County
George County High School, Lucedale

Greene County
Greene County High School, Leakesville

Grenada County
Grenada High School, Grenada
Kirk Academy, Grenada

Hancock County
Bay High School, Bay St. Louis
Hancock High School, Kiln
Our Lady Academy, Bay St. Louis
Saint Stanislaus College, Bay St. Louis

Harrison County
Biloxi High School, Biloxi
Christian Collegiate Academy, Gulfport
D'Iberville High School, D'Iberville
Gulfport High School, Gulfport
Harrison Central High School, Gulfport
Long Beach Senior High School, Long Beach
Pass Christian High School, Pass Christian
St. Patrick Catholic High School, Biloxi
Temple Christian Academy
West Harrison High School, Gulfport

Hinds County

Hinds County Agricultural High School, Utica
Rebul Academy, Learned
Terry High School, Terry

Clinton

Clinton Christian Academy
Clinton High School
Mount Salus Christian School

Jackson

Callaway High School
Capital City Alternative School
Forest Hill High School
Hillcrest Christian School
Jackson Academy
Jim Hill High School
Lanier High School
Mississippi School for the Blind
Mississippi School for the Deaf
Murrah High School
Provine High School
Wingfield High School

Raymond

Central Hinds Academy
Raymond High School

Holmes County
Central Holmes Christian School, Lexington
Holmes County Central High School, Lexington

Humphreys County
Humphreys Academy, Belzoni
Humphreys County High School, Belzoni

Issaquena County
none

Itawamba County
Itawamba Agricultural High School, Fulton
Mantachie Attendance Center, Mantachie
Tremont Attendance Center, Tremont

Jackson County
East Central High School, Hurley
Gautier High School, Gautier
Mississippi Division of Independent Study, Ocean Springs
Moss Point High School, Moss Point
Ocean Springs High School, Ocean Springs
Pascagoula High School, Pascagoula
Resurrection Catholic School, Pascagoula
St. Martin High School, Ocean Springs
Vancleave High School, Vancleave
Trent Lott academy, Pascagoula

Jasper County
Bay Springs High School, Bay Springs
Heidelberg High School, Heidelberg
Stringer Attendance Center, Stringer
Sylva Bay Academy, Bay Springs

Jefferson County
Jefferson County High School, Fayette

Jefferson Davis County
Prentiss Christian School, Prentiss
Jefferson Davis County High School, Bassfield

Jones County
Laurel Christian High School, Laurel
Laurel High School, Laurel
Northeast Jones High School, Laurel
South Jones High School, Ellisville
West Jones High School, Laurel

Kemper County
Kemper County High School, DeKalb

Lafayette County
Lafayette High School, Oxford
Oxford High School, Oxford

Lamar County
Bass Memorial Academy, Lumberton
Lamar Christian School, Purvis
Lumberton High School, Lumberton
Oak Grove High School, Oak Grove
Purvis High School, Purvis
Sumrall Middle/High School, Sumrall

Lauderdale County
Clarkdale Attendance Center, Meridian
Lamar School, Meridian
Meridian High School, Meridian
Northeast Lauderdale High School, Meridian
Southeast Lauderdale High School, Meridian
West Lauderdale High School, Collinsville
Russell Christian, Meridian

Lawrence County
Lawrence County High School, Monticello

Leake County
Leake Academy, Madden
Leake Central High School, Carthage (formerly Carthage High School)
Leake County High School, Walnut Grove (formerly South Leake High School)

Lee County
Baldwyn High School, Baldwyn
Faith Christian School, Guntown
Mooreville High School, Mooreville
Nettleton High School, Nettleton
Saltillo High School, Saltillo
Shannon High School, Shannon
Tupelo Christian Academy, Tupelo
Tupelo Christian Preparatory School, Belden
Tupelo High School, Tupelo

LeFlore County
Delta Streets Academy, Greenwood
Greenwood High School, Greenwood
Leflore County High School, Itta Bena
Pillow Academy, Greenwood

Lincoln County
Bogue Chitto Attendance Center, Bogue Chitto
Brookhaven Academy, Brookhaven
Brookhaven High School, Brookhaven
Enterprise Attendance Center, Brookhaven
Loyd Star Attendance Center, Brookhaven
Mississippi School of the Arts, Brookhaven
West Lincoln Attendance Center, Brookhaven

Lowndes County
Caledonia High School, Caledonia
Columbus High School, Columbus
Heritage Academy, Columbus
Columbus Christian Academy, Steens
Mississippi School for Mathematics and Science, Columbus
New Hope High School, Columbus
Victory Christian Academy, Columbus
West Lowndes High School, Columbus

Madison County
Canton Academy, Canton
Canton High School, Canton
Germantown High School, Madison
Madison Central High School, Madison
Madison-Ridgeland Academy, Madison
Ridgeland High School, Ridgeland
St. Andrew's Episcopal School, Ridgeland
St. Joseph Catholic School, Madison
Tri-County Academy, Flora
Velma Jackson High School, Camden
The Veritas School, Ridgeland (closed)

Marion County
Columbia Academy, Columbia
Columbia High School, Columbia
East Marion High School, Columbia
West Marion High School, Foxworth

Marshall County
Bethlehem Christian School, Potts Camp
Byers High School, Holly Springs
Byhalia High School, Byhalia
Holly Springs High School, Holly Springs
Marshall Academy, Holly Springs
Potts Camp High School, Potts Camp

Monroe County
Aberdeen High School, Aberdeen
Amory Christian Academy, Amory
Amory High School, Amory
Hamilton School, Hamilton
Hatley School, Hatley
Smithville School, Smithville

Montgomery County
Winona Christian School, Winona
Winona Secondary School, Winona

Neshoba County
Neshoba Central High School, Philadelphia
Philadelphia High School, Philadelphia

Newton County
Newton Career Center, Newton
Newton County Academy, Decatur
Newton County High School, Decatur
Newton High School, Newton
Union High School, Union

Noxubee County
Noxubee County High School, Macon

Oktibbeha County
Starkville Academy, Starkville
Starkville High School, Starkville

Panola County
North Delta High School, Batesville
North Panola High School, Sardis
Pope School, Pope
South Panola High School, Batesville

Pearl River County
Pearl River Central High School, Carriere
Picayune Memorial High School, Picayune
Poplarville Junior Senior High School, Poplarville

Perry County
Perry Central High School, New Augusta
Richton High School, Richton

Pike County
McComb High School, McComb
North Pike Career & Technical Center
North Pike Senior High School, Summit
Parklane Academy, McComb
South Pike High School, Magnolia
South Pike Vocational Center, Magnolia

Pontotoc County
North Pontotoc High School, Ecru
Pontotoc High School, Pontotoc
South Pontotoc High School, Pontotoc

Prentiss County
Booneville High School, Booneville
Jumpertown School, Booneville
New Site High School, New Site
Thrasher School, Booneville
Wheeler School, Wheeler

Quitman County
Delta Academy, Marks
Madison Palmer High School

Rankin County
Brandon High School, Brandon
Discovery Christian School, Florence
East Rankin Academy, Pelahatchie
Florence High School, Florence
Jackson Preparatory School, Flowood
McLaurin Attendance Center ,Star
Northwest Rankin High School, Flowood
Pearl High School, Pearl
Pelahatchie Attendance Center, Pelahatchie
Piney Woods Country Life School, Piney Woods
Pisgah High School, Sandhill
Puckett Attendance Center, Puckett
Rankin Academy, Star (1971 - 1996)
Richland High School, Richland
Star School, Star (Circa 1923-1950)
Hartfield Academy, Flowood (formerly University Christian School)

Scott County
Forest High School, Forest
Lake High School, Lake
Morton High School, Morton
Scott Central Attendance Center, Forest
Sebastopol Attendance Center, Sebastopol

Sharkey County
Sharkey-Issaquena Academy, Rolling Fork
South Delta High School, Rolling Fork

Simpson County
Magee High School, Magee
Mendenhall High School, Mendenhall
Simpson County Academy, Mendenhall

Smith County
Mize Attendance Center, Mize
Raleigh High School, Raleigh
Smith County Career Center, Raleigh
Taylorsville Attendance Center, Taylorsville

Stone County
Stone High School, Wiggins
Gateway Christian Academy, Wiggins

Sunflower County
Drew High School, Drew
Gentry High School, Indianola
Indianola Academy, Indianola
North Sunflower Academy, Drew
Thomas E. Edwards, Sr. High School, Ruleville

Tallahatchie County
Charleston High School, Charleston
West Tallahatchie High School, Webb

Tate County
Coldwater Attendance Center, Coldwater
Independence High School, Independence
Magnolia Heights School, Senatobia
Senatobia Junior Senior High School, Senatobia
Strayhorn High School, Sarah

Tippah County
Blue Mountain School, Blue Mountain
Falkner High School, Falkner
Pine Grove School, Pine Grove
Ripley High School, Ripley
Walnut Attendance Center, Walnut

Tishomingo County
Belmont School, Belmont
Tishomingo County High School, Iuka

Tunica County
Rosa Fort High School, Tunica
Tunica Academy, Tunica

Union County
East Union Attendance Center, Blue Springs
Ingomar Attendance Center, New Albany
New Albany High School, New Albany
Myrtle Attendance Center, Myrtle
Victory Christian Academy, New Albany
[[Union County School District (Mississippi)}West Union Attendance Center]], Myrtle

Walthall County
Salem Attendance Center, Tylertown
Tylertown High School, Tylertown

Warren County
All Saints' Episcopal School, Vicksburg (closed)
Porter's Chapel Academy, Vicksburg
St. Aloysius High School, Vicksburg
Vicksburg High School, Vicksburg
Warren Central High School, Vicksburg

Washington County
Deer Creek School, Arcola
Greenville Christian School, Greenville
Greenville Technical Center
Greenville Weston High School, Greenville
King's Court Christian Academy, Greenville
Leland High School, Leland
O'Bannon High School, Greenville
Riverside High School, Avon
Saint Joseph High School, Greenville
Simmons High School, Hollandale
Washington School, Greenville

Wayne County
Wayne Academy, Waynesboro
Wayne County High School, Waynesboro

Webster County
East Webster High School, Maben
Eupora High School, Eupora

Wilkinson County
Centreville Academy, Centreville
Wilkinson County Christian Academy, Woodville
Wilkinson County High School, Woodville

Winston County
Grace Christian School, Louisville
Louisville High School, Louisville
Nanih Waiya School, Louisville
Noxapater School, Noxapater
Winston Academy, Louisville

Yalobusha County
Coffeeville High School, Coffeeville
Water Valley High School, Water Valley

Yazoo County
Benton Academy, Benton
Manchester Academy, Yazoo City
Yazoo City High School, Yazoo City
Yazoo County High School, Yazoo City

See also
List of school districts in Mississippi
List of private schools in Mississippi

References

Mississippi
High schools